The coat of arms of Ontario is the heraldic symbol representing the Canadian province of Ontario. The arms contains symbols reflecting Ontario's British heritage along with local symbols. At the upper part of the shield is the red cross of St. George, representing England. The lower portion of the shield features three golden maple leaves on a green background.

The original arms, consisting of only the shield, were granted by royal warrant of Queen Victoria on May 26, 1868. The arms were further augmented with supporters, a crest, and motto, by royal warrant of King Edward VII on February 27, 1909.

The shield, on a Red Ensign, features in Ontario's provincial flag.

History 
The year following Confederation, arms were granted by royal warrant from Queen Victoria on May 26, 1868  to Ontario, along with the three other provinces of the new Dominion of Canada, Quebec, Nova Scotia and New Brunswick. The Dominion Arms were simple and lacked supporters. The Arms of Ontario comprised what is now the escutcheon or shield of the current Arms of Ontario. This original arms can be seen on the Flag of Ontario, which consists of a defaced Red Ensign, with the Royal Union Flag in the canton and the arms in the fly. Also seen on the Arms used by the Lieutenant Governor of Ontario surrounded by a wreath of gold maple leaves.

In the warrant, Queen Victoria authorized the four arms of the first provinces to be quartered for use on the Great Seal of Canada, and while this was not done for the first Great Seal, it is through this reference it became the de facto Arms of Canada until 1921. That arms was then also used in the first Canadian Red Ensign, which was flown at the Battle of Vimy Ridge.

The supporters, crest, and motto, designed by Toronto barrister Edward Marion Chadwick, were added on February 27, 1909, by warrant of King Edward VII.

The province's arms stand out for being without royal symbols, namely a crown—although the motto of Ontario, which translates from the Latin "Ut Incepit Fidelis Sic Permanet" as "Loyal She Began, Thus She Remains" references perpetual loyalty to the Crown.

Symbolism 
Crest
The crest is a black bear, native to Ontario, passant sable, on a gold and green wreath.

Shield
The shield of arms consists of three gold maple leaves, representative of Ontario, on a green background, above which on the upper third is a wide white band with a red St. George's cross, which recalls the historic connection with Britain in Upper Canada.

Supporters
A moose dexter and deer sinister are native to Ontario.

Motto
The motto is "Ut incepit fidelis sic permanet", Latin for "Loyal she began, loyal she remains". It refers to the Loyalist refugees from the American Revolution, who settled in the colony of Quebec, and for whom the area was separated as Upper Canada.

Legislative Assembly variant

History 
As part of the celebration in 1992 of the bicentennial of the first meeting of the legislature of Upper Canada at Newark (Niagara-on-the-Lake) on September 17, 1792, a petition was made by the then-Speaker, David Warner, to the Chief Herald of Canada for the granting of a unique coat of arms which would emphasize the distinctive character of the Legislative Assembly of Ontario and distinguish the assembly's identity from the government's. To that point, the assembly had used the coat of arms of the Government of Ontario. The petition was granted and the new coat of arms was presented by then Governor-General Ramon Hnatyshyn at a ceremony in the Legislative Chamber on April 26, 1993. Ontario's is the first legislature in Canada with a coat of arms separate from the provincial coat of arms.

Symbolism 

Crest
The crest is a griffin holding a calumet.
The griffin is an ancient symbol of justice and equity. The calumet symbolizes the meeting of spirit and discussion that Ontario's first peoples believe accompanies the use of the pipe.

Crown
The crown on the wreath represents national and provincial loyalties; its rim is studded with the provincial gemstone, amethyst, and topped with three maple leaves, symbolizing Canada, and two white trilliums, the flower of Ontario.

Shield
The shield of arms consists of two crossed maces, joined by the shield of arms of Ontario, on a field of green with a gold rim. 
The mace is the traditional symbol of the authority of the Speaker. Shown on the left is the current mace. On the right is the original from the time of the first parliament in 1792.

Supporters
A deer dexter and sinister, which are native to Canada
These animals represent the natural riches of the province. 
The Loyalist coronets at their necks honour the original European settlers in Ontario who brought with them the parliamentary form of government. 
The Royal Crowns, left 1992, right 1792, recognize the parliamentary bicentennial and recall Ontario's heritage as a constitutional monarchy. They were granted as a special honour by Her Majesty Queen Elizabeth II on the recommendation of the Governor General.

Compartment
In the base, the maple leaves are for Canada, the white trilliums for Ontario and the roses for York (now Toronto), the provincial capital.

Motto
The motto is "Audi alteram partem", one of a series of Latin phrases carved in the Chamber of the Ontario Legislative Building. It challenges MPs to "hear the other side".

See also 
Arms of Canada
Coat of arms of Toronto
Ontario
Flag of Ontario
Symbols of Ontario
Canadian heraldry
National symbols of Canada
List of Canadian provincial and territorial symbols
Heraldry

References

External links 

Coat of arms of Ontario – Government of Ontario
Ontario coat of arms – Government of Canada website
Arms of Ontario in the online Public Register of Arms, Flags and Badges
Royal Warrant granting Armorial Bearings for the Provinces of Ontario, Quebec, Nova Scotia, New Brunswick, and a Great Seal for the Dominion of Canada Canada Gazette, volume 3, number 22, 27 November 1869, page 36

Provincial symbols of Ontario
Ontario
Ontario
Ontario
Ontario
Ontario